Australian property law, or property law in Australia, is the system of laws regulating and prioritising the Property law rights, interests and responsibilities of individuals in relation to "things". These things are a form of "property" or "right" to possession or ownership of an object. The law orders or prioritises rights and classifies property as either real and tangible, such as land, or intangible, such as the right of an author to their literary works or personal but tangible, such as a book or a pencil. The scope of what constitutes a thing capable of being classified as property and when an individual or body corporate gains priority of interest over a thing has in legal scholarship been heavily debated on a philosophical level.

Land law

Land is the predominant focus of Western property law, particularly Australian property law. Legal developments in this field outweigh the development of other forms of property law, this is primarily due to the high value of land in comparison to other forms of property, such as chattels.

Each state in Australia has a different regime for the regulation and bureaucratisation of land. It is a largely statute-based area of the law but can still be influenced by the common law and principles that originate from Australia's history as a colony of the United Kingdom, where land and estate law developed through the ambit of feudalism.

Property law is enabling in that it creates a system for evidencing, recognising and transferring title to land, facilitating its use as an economic instrument. Other legal instruments in property law that facilitate the private and commercial dealing of land include the mortgage, lease, covenant and easement.

All Australian colonies (now states and territories) adopted the Torrens system of land registration of title between 1857 and 1875. The Torrens title system was introduced first in South Australia by Sir Robert Richard Torrens, the Registrar-General of Deeds, through the Real Property Act 1858. Victoria adopted the system with the Real Property Act 1862, and New South Wales with the commencement of the Real Property Act 1862 on 1 January 1863.

In Australia most land is held under the Torrens Title system, although remnants of the old system of land title still remain. All land in the Australian Capital Territory is leasehold (effectively Torrens freehold), while and much of the Northern Territory is held under Crown lease. Native Title is recognised as a separate form of ownership. Some land remains as Crown Land (i.e. in Australia, public land).

In accordance with the principles of the Torrens system, each state maintains a land titles register of land in the state that has been registered under the system, which also shows the proprietor (owner) of the land. This system was devised to reduce the amount of fraud relating to land due to falsification of title deeds. It does so with "ownership" of the land being confirmed only upon registration of the property. That is, "it is not a system of registration of title but a system of title by registration". This gives a purchaser "greater assurance, indeed certainty, of title".  The principle of "indefeasibility" of title - where a right has been entered on the register, it cannot be defeated by later rights except in certain circumstances - further protects the Torrens title holder.

The Torrens system also provides for registration of other entitlements to land such as a mortgage, by which land is used to secure a loan.

Table of equivalents 

The table above lists the core legislation in each jurisdiction of Australia regulating interests in land law in relation to property (negotiable instruments) and the scheme of registration (title).

Goods and chattels

Australia's law in relation to goods and chattels (items which are not land or intellectual property) follows that of the United Kingdom.

Intellectual property

Australia follows the English traditions for intellectual property, and is a signatory of the Berne Convention for the Protection of Literary and Artistic Works and operates a system of automatic copyright. Other areas of Australian intellectual property include patents, designs and Plant breeders' rights.

See also
Torrens title (land registration and land transfer system)

References

Further reading
 
 

 
Legal professions
Solicitors
Law of the United Kingdom